Rudyard lake railway station may refer to either

 Cliffe Park railway station which was called Rudyard Lake from opening in 1905 until 1926.
 Rudyard railway station which was called Rudyard Lake from 1926 until closure in 1960.